Dragoljub Kostić is a former Yugoslav and Serbian footballer who played as a striker.

Career
Kostić started out at his hometown club Priština, competing in the Yugoslav Second League. He was transferred to newly promoted Yugoslav First League side Napredak Kruševac in the summer of 1976. With 17 goals, Kostić was the Yugoslav First League joint top scorer in the 1979–80 season, alongside Safet Sušić. He thus helped his team to a fourth-place finish, their highest-ever position in the top flight, while earning a spot in UEFA competitions for the first time in history. He reportedly had an offer to play for Tottenham Hotspur in England but declined.

Before retiring from the game, Kostić spent the final years of his career with Jedinstvo Paraćin, playing in the lower leagues.

Statistics

Honours

Club
Napredak Kruševac
 Yugoslav Second League: 1977–78

Individual
 Yugoslav First League Top Scorer: 1979–80

References

External links
 

Association football forwards
FK Napredak Kruševac players
Kosovo Serbs
Serbian footballers
Sportspeople from Pristina
Yugoslav First League players
Yugoslav footballers
1950 births
Living people
FC Prishtina players